Louis Gedeon (1877-1950) was a United States Army private who received the Medal of Honor on February 4, 1900. During the Philippine–American War.

Gedeon joined the army from his birthplace in February 1899. He later obtained the rank of sergeant.

Medal of Honor citation
Rank and Organization: Private, Company G, 19th U.S. Infantry. Place and Date: At Mount Amia, Cebu, Philippine Islands, February 4, 1900. Entered Service At: Pittsburgh, Pa. Birth: Pittsburgh, Pa. Date of Issue: March 10, 1902.
Citation:

Singlehanded, defended his mortally wounded captain from an overwhelming force of the enemy.

See also

List of Philippine–American War Medal of Honor recipients

Note
One of the main sources of information about the action was provided by then Corporal Benjamin Foulois, who later became an aviation pioneer and U.S. Army Major General who wrote a letter to Gedeon's Mother.

References

1950 deaths
1877 births
Military personnel from Pittsburgh
United States Army soldiers
United States Army Medal of Honor recipients
Burials at United States Soldiers' and Airmen's Home National Cemetery
American military personnel of the Philippine–American War
Philippine–American War recipients of the Medal of Honor